Yesun Temur may refer to:

 Yesün Temür (Yuan dynasty)
 Yesun Temur (Chagatai Khanate)